Dunearn is a hill fort located  south south east of Nairn in Highland, Scotland.

The site commands uninterrupted views in all directions of the valley of the Findhorn including towards the pass of Streens in the west, which leads to upper Strath Dearn.

Etymology
The modern name, which is shared by a nearby farm is from the Scottish Gaelic, Dùn Éireann meaning "Hill(fort) on the Findhorn". Although Gaelic in origin the derivation of the name of the River Findhorn itself is not absolutely clear. Watson (1926) states that it is derived from Fionn Èire, meaning "white Ireland" which  "doubtless refers to the white sands of the estuary". The dative Èireann gave rise to the use of the anglified 'earn' or 'erne' in other local names such as Invererne, Cullerne and Earnhill.

Structure
The slopes up to the fort are steep from all directions save the west. The summit is S-shaped and was surrounded by two parallel walls which closely followed the contour that delineates the summit plateau. The visual evidence of the inner rampart is simply scattered stones and boulders along with some evidence of vitrification, suggesting that the fort may have been burned at some point in its history. The outer wall lies about  beyond the inner and is a "mere crest-line, dotted rather sparsely with stones and boulders". The proximity of the two walls to one another suggests it was designed as a single structure with stabilising timbers in the centre.

Local comparisons
Dunearn is one of a group of larger, more open, structures such as Craig Phadrig, which is thought to have been constructed in the 4th Century CE and Ord Hill of Kessock, both to the west near modern-day Inverness. There are various smaller structures in the area, such as Doune of Relugas,  and Dun Earn lower down the Findhorn valley and Dun Evan and Castle Finlay in the Nairn valley.

Modern uses
It is thought that the relatively level summit of the hill was farmed for many years until 1906, including ploughing  and it is likely that the stone remains of the fortification are "slight" as a result.

An artillery base was established in the fort during the Second World War.

References

Notes

Citations

Bibliography
 RCAHMS Emergency Survey.(1943) Manuscripts (vol.2)
 Feachem, R. (1963b) A guide to prehistoric Scotland. 1st. London. Page(s): 140 RCAHMS Shelf Number: E.2.FEA
 Isaksen, Leif (2017) The Hilltop Enclosure on Cluny Hill, Forres description, destruction, disappearance". Lancaster University. Retrieved 28 May 2018.
 
 Watson, W. J. (1994) The Celtic Place-Names of Scotland. Edinburgh. Birlinn. . First published 1926.

Hill forts in Scotland
Vitrified forts in Scotland
Archaeological sites in Highland (council area)
Iron Age sites in Scotland